Church of St. Raphael the Archangel is a Roman Catholic church in Šnipiškės, Vilnius. Former Jesuits monastery ensemble is located nearby which currently is used by the Department of Cultural Heritage of Lithuania.

Close to the church there was a wayside shrine, containing a statue of Christ Carrying the Cross. The shrine was built around 1710 during the Great Northern War plague outbreak in Vilnius.

On 14 August 1904, the first President of the independent Lithuania Antanas Smetona married with Sofija Smetonienė in the Church of St. Raphael.

Gallery

See also
 List of Jesuit sites

References

 

Roman Catholic churches completed in 1709
18th-century Roman Catholic church buildings in Lithuania
Baroque architecture in Lithuania
Roman Catholic churches in Vilnius
1709 establishments in the Polish–Lithuanian Commonwealth